Andrea Massa may refer to:

 Andrea Massa (bishop), 17th century Roman Catholic bishop
 Andrea Massa (electrical engineer), professor at the University of Trento